Mistress is the feminine form of the English word "master" (master + -ess) and may refer to:

Romance and relationships 

 Mistress (lover), a term for a woman who is in a sexual and romantic relationship with a man who is married to a different woman

Title or form of address
 Mistress (form of address), an old-fashioned term for the lady of the house
 Ms., original abbreviation
 Mistress (college), a female head of a college 
 Mistress of the Robes, the senior lady of the British Royal Household
 Female schoolmaster, also called a schoolmistress or "schoolmarm"

In ancient religions
 Isis, Egyptian goddess known as the mistress of the house of life 
 Hathor, Egyptian goddess known as the mistress of the west
 Nepthys, Egyptian goddess of the underworld, known as the mistress of the temple
 Despoina, a Greek title for the mistress of the house, applied to various women and goddesses
 Potnia theron, or mistress of the animals, a title applied by Homer to the Greek goddess Artemis
 Potnia ("Mistress"), a title applied to various Greek goddesses
 Mistress of the labyrinth, in the palace of Knossos in Crete

In arts and entertainment
 Mistress (band), a sludge metal/grindcore band from Birmingham, England
 Mistress, a split-up death metal band from Germany, fronted by Angela Gossow
 Mistress (1992 film)
 Mistress (1987 film) starring Victoria Principal
 Mistresses (British TV series)
 Mistresses (American TV series), American adaptation of the UK series
 Mistress (TV series), South Korean adaptation of the UK series
 "Mistress", a song by Disturbed from Believe
 "Mistress", a song by Rebecca Ferguson from Superwoman
 "Mistress", a song by Suede from The Blue Hour
 Mistress (novel), a 2013 novel by James Patterson
 Mistress Isabelle Brooks, American drag queen

Other uses 

 Dominatrix, in BDSM

See also
 The Mistress (disambiguation)